Cybersix is an Argentinean comic book series published in 1991, created by the Argentine authors Carlos Trillo (story) and Carlos Meglia (art) for the comics magazine Skorpio (Eura Editoriale). The series first appeared in Spanish in November 1993. It follows the eponymous leather-clad genetic engineering survivor who cross-dresses (to conceal her identity) working as a male teacher during the day, and fights against the scientist who created her at night.

The series was adapted into a live-action television series and an animated television series that garnered positive critical reception from the Pulcinella Awards.

Plot
Von Reichter is a surviving member of Schutzstaffel in World War II. He works on experiments in South America, creating the Cyber series of artificial humanoids with super strength and agility. The 5000 original Cybers became servants, mimicked human emotions and making their will. When they disobey orders, Reichter orders them all to be destroyed. After the death of Cyber-29, Reichter transfers his brain into the body of a panther, Data-7. Cyber-6 (Cybersix) is one of the survivors, who escapes and arrives in the city of Meridiana. She disguises herself as school teacher Adrian Seidelman, after the real one is killed in a car crash. Cybersix defeats monsters called "Fixed Ideas" – humanoids of the Techno series – in order to drink the green sustenance liquid contained within them. Along the way, she meets an orphaned boy Julian, Reichter's cloned son José, and high school teacher Lucas Amato.

Production

Comics
The comics were originally published in Italy in the magazine Skorpio in 113 weekly 12-pages installments from May 1991 to July 1994, followed by 45 96-pages comic books between November 1994 and January 1999. Parts of the material were  translated in Spanish and published in Argentina (since 1993 by El Globo Editor) and in Spain (since 1995 by Planeta De Agostini). Collections were released in French, with twelve volumes distributed by Editions Vents d'Ouest between 1994 and 1998.

Live-action series
The series debuted in Argentina on 15 March 1995. It was produced by Luis Gandulfo, Sebastián Parrotta, Fernando Rascovsky and Andre Ronco, and written by Ricardo Rodríguez, Carlos Meglia and Carlos Trillo. The series aired on Telefé, but was cancelled after only a few episodes due to low ratings. Cybersix was played by former model and actress Carolina Peleritti, José was played by Rodrigo de la Serna, and Doguyy was played by Mario Moscoso.

Animated series

The series debuted in Canada and Argentina on 6 September 1999, and was subsequently dubbed in French, Polish, Japanese, Malaysian and Thai. It was produced by Canadian company NoA and animated by Japanese studio Tokyo Movie Shinsha. The series' music was composed by Robbi Finkel, and character designs were overseen by Teiichi Takiguchi. The show was aimed at children by toning down the comics' darker themes. Two seasons were originally planned, but it was cancelled after the first season due to conflicts between production studios. The title sequence and closing credits featured music composed by Finkel and lyrics written by Robert Olivier, which were sung by jazz vocalist Coral Egan. On 28 April 2001, Cybersix won "Special Mention for the Best Science Fiction Program" at the Pulcinella Awards in Italy for that year's competition. The series was licensed to DVD by Discotek Media on 26 August 2014. The box set features commentary by Cathy Weseluck and Brady Hartel on episodes 1 and 13.

Voice cast
Cathy Weseluck as Cybersix
Michael Dobson as Lucas Amato
Terry Klassen as Von Reichter
Andrew Francis as Julian
Alex Doduk as José
Janyse Jaud as Lori Anderson
Brian Drummond as Yashimoto
L. Harvey Gold as Terra
Chantal Strand as Ikiko

Episode list

Controversy with Dark Angel and lawsuit
Meglia and Trillo filed a lawsuit against James Cameron, claiming that Dark Angel plagiarized the series. Trillo and Meglia accused the show of stealing most of the plot from the comic and most recognizable elements. In a 2007 interview, Trillo stated that he and Meglia dropped the lawsuit due to lack of financial resources, although the issue is still a matter of controversy.

References

External links
 
 
 Telecom's official Cybersix page (English)
 Telecom's official Cybersix page (Japanese)

1991 comics debuts
Argentine comics titles
Science fiction comics
Biopunk comics
Vampires in comics
Latin American superheroes
Comics adapted into animated series
Comics adapted into television series
Fictional cross-dressers
Vigilante characters in comics
Fictional characters without a name